The bibliography of George Orwell includes journalism, essays, novels, and non-fiction books written by the British writer Eric Blair (1903–1950), either under his own name or, more usually, under his pen name George Orwell. Orwell was a prolific writer on topics related to contemporary English society and literary criticism, who has been declared "perhaps the 20th century's best chronicler of English culture." His non-fiction cultural and political criticism constitutes the majority of his work, but Orwell also wrote in several genres of fictional literature.

Orwell is best remembered for his political commentary as a left-wing anti-totalitarian. As he explained in the essay "Why I Write" (1946), "Every line of serious work that I have written since 1936 has been written, directly or indirectly, against totalitarianism and for democratic socialism, as I understand it." To that end, Orwell used his fiction as well as his journalism to defend his political convictions. He first achieved widespread acclaim with his fictional novella Animal Farm and cemented his place in history with the publication of Nineteen Eighty-Four shortly before his death. While fiction accounts for a small fraction of his total output, these two novels are his best-selling works, having sold almost fifty million copies in sixty-two languages by 2007—more than any other pair of books by a twentieth-century author.

Orwell wrote non-fiction—including book reviews, editorials, and investigative journalism—for a variety of British periodicals. In his lifetime he published hundreds of articles including several regular columns in British newsweeklies related to literary and cultural criticism as well as his explicitly political writing. In addition he wrote book-length investigations of poverty in Britain in the form of Down and Out in Paris and London and The Road to Wigan Pier and one of the first retrospectives on the Spanish Civil War in Homage to Catalonia. Between 1941 and 1946 he also wrote fifteen "London Letters" for the American political and literary quarterly Partisan Review, the first of which appeared in the issue dated March–April 1941.

Only two compilations of Orwell's body of work were published in his lifetime, but since his death over a dozen collected editions have appeared. Two attempts have been made at comprehensive collections: The Collected Essays, Journalism and Letters in four volumes (1968, 1970), co-edited by Ian Angus and Orwell's widow Sonia Brownell; and The Complete Works of George Orwell, in 20 volumes, edited by Peter Davison, which  began publication in the mid-1980s. The latter includes an addendum, The Lost Orwell (2007).

The impact of Orwell's large corpus is manifested in additions to the Western canon such as Nineteen Eighty-Four, its subjection to continued public notice and scholarly analyses, and the changes to vernacular English it has effected—notably the adoption of "Orwellian" as a description of totalitarian societies.

Books: non-fiction and novels
Orwell wrote six novels: Burmese Days, A Clergyman's Daughter, Keep the Aspidistra Flying, Coming Up for Air, Animal Farm and Nineteen Eighty-Four. Most of these were semi-autobiographical. Burmese Days was inspired by his period working as an imperial policeman and is fictionalized; A Clergyman's Daughter follows a young woman who passes out from overwork and wakes up an amnesiac, forced to wander the countryside as she finds herself, eventually losing her belief in God, despite being the daughter of a clergyman. Keep the Aspidistra Flying and Coming Up for Air are examinations of the British class system. Animal Farm and Nineteen Eighty-Four are his most famous novels.

In addition to his novels Orwell also wrote three non-fiction books. Down and Out in Paris and London records his experiences tramping in those two cities. The Road to Wigan Pier is initially a study of poverty in the North of England, but ends with an extended autobiographical essay describing some of Orwell's experiences with poverty. Homage to Catalonia recounts his experiences as a volunteer fighting fascism with the Workers' Party of Marxist Unification in anarchist Catalonia during the Spanish Civil War.

Down and Out in Paris and London (9 January 1933, Victor Gollancz Ltd)
Burmese Days (25 October 1934, Harper & Brothers)
A Clergyman's Daughter (11 March 1935, Victor Gollancz Ltd)
Keep the Aspidistra Flying (20 April 1936, Victor Gollancz Ltd)
The Road to Wigan Pier (February 1937, Left Book Club edition; 8 March 1937 Victor Gollancz Ltd edition for the general public)
Homage to Catalonia (25 April 1938, Secker and Warburg)
Coming Up for Air (12 June 1939, Victor Gollancz Ltd)
Animal Farm (17 August 1945, Secker and Warburg)
Nineteen Eighty-Four (8 June 1949, Secker and Warburg)

Articles
Orwell wrote hundreds of essays, book reviews and editorials. His insights into linguistics, literature and politics—in particular anti-fascism, anti-communism, and democratic socialism—continued to be influential decades after his death. Over a dozen of these were published in collections during his life—Inside the Whale and Other Essays by his original publisher Victor Gollancz Ltd in 1940, and Critical Essays by Secker and Warburg in 1946. The latter press also published the collections Shooting an Elephant and Other Essays in 1950 (republished by Penguin in 2003) and England Your England and Other Essays in 1953.

Since his death many collections of essays have appeared, with the first attempt at a comprehensive collection being the four-volume Collected Essays, Letters and Journalism of George Orwell edited by Ian Angus and Sonia Brownell, which was published by Secker and Warburg and Harcourt, Brace, Jovanovich in 1968–1970. Peter Davison of De Montfort University spent 17 years researching and correcting the entirety of Orwell's works with Angus and Sheila Davison, and devoted the last eleven volumes of the twenty-volume series The Complete Works of George Orwell to essays, letters, and journal entries. The entire series was initially printed by Secker and Warburg in 1986, finished by Random House in 1998, and revised between 2000 and 2002.

Pamphlets
Starting with The Lion and the Unicorn (1941), several of Orwell's longer essays took the form of pamphlets:
The Lion and the Unicorn: Socialism and the English Genius was printed by his publisher Secker and Warburg as Searchlight Books No. 1 on 19 February 1941.
Betrayal of the Left was printed by his other regular publisher Victor Gollancz Ltd. in 1941, with material from Victor Gollancz, John Strachey, and others.
Victory or Vested Interest? came from The Labour Book Service on 15 May 1942, with Orwell's "Culture and Democracy" (made up of the pieces "Fascism and Democracy" and "Patriots and Revolutionaries") amongst others.
Talking to India, by E. M. Forster, Richie Calder, Cedric Dover, Hsiao Ch'ien and Others: A Selection of English Language Broadcasts to India was published in 1943 by Allen & Unwin, edited with an introduction by Orwell.James Burnham and the Managerial Revolution – Socialist Book Centre, printing of Second Thoughts on James Burnham under this title in July 1946.The English People was printed by HarperCollins 1947.British Pamphleteers Volume 1: From the 16th Century the 18th Century from Allan Wingate, spring 1948 was co-edited by Orwell and Reginald Reynolds with an introduction by Orwell.

Poems
Orwell was not widely known for writing verse, but he did publish several poems that have survived, including many written during his school days:

"Awake! Young Men of England" (1914)
"" (1929)
"A Dressed Man and a Naked Man" (1933)
"A Happy Vicar I Might Have Been" (1935)
"Ironic Poem About Prostitution" (written prior to 1936)
"Kitchener" (1916)
"The Lesser Evil" (1924)
"A Little Poem" (1935)
"On a Ruined Farm Near the His Master's Voice Gramophone Factory" (1934)
"Our Minds Are Married, but We Are Too Young" (1918)
"The Pagan" (1918)
"The Wounded Cricketer" (1920)
"Poem from Burma" (1922–1927)
"Romance" (1925)
"Sometimes in the Middle Autumn Days" (1933)
"Suggested by a Toothpaste Advertisement" (1918–1919)
"Summer-like for an Instant" (1933)
"As One Non-Combatant to Another" (1943)

In October 2015 Finlay Publisher, for The Orwell Society, published George Orwell: The Complete Poetry, compiled and presented by Dione Venables.

Editing
In addition to the pamphlets British Pamphleteers Volume 1: From the 16th Century the 18th Century and Talking to India, by E. M. Forster, Richie Calder, Cedric Dover, Hsiao Ch'ien and Others: A Selection of English Language Broadcasts to India, Orwell edited two newspapers during his Eton years—College Days/The Colleger (1917) and Election Times (1917–1921). While working for the BBC, he collected six editions of a poetry magazine named Voice which were broadcast by Orwell, Mulk Raj Anand, John Atkins, Edmund Blunden, Venu Chitale, William Empson, Vida Hope, Godfrey Kenton, Una Marson, Herbert Read, and Stephen Spender. The magazine was published and distributed to the readers before being broadcast by the BBC. Issue five has not been recovered and was consequently excluded from W. J. West's collection of BBC transcripts.

Collected editions
Two essay collections were published during Orwell's lifetime—Inside the Whale and Other Essays in 1940 and Critical Essays in 1946 (the latter published in the United States as Dickens, Dali, and Others in 1958.) His publisher followed up these anthologies with Shooting an Elephant and Other Essays in 1950, England Your England and Other Essays in 1953—which was revised as Such, Such Were the Joys—and Collected Essays in 1961. The first significant publications in the United States were Doubleday's A Collection of Essays by George Orwell from 1954, 1956's The Orwell Reader, Fiction, Essays, and Reportage from Harcourt Brace Jovanovich, and Penguin's Selected Essays in 1957; re-released in 1962 with the title Inside the Whale and Other Essays and in abridged form as Why I Write in 2005 as a part of the Great Ideas series. In the aforementioned series, Penguin also published the short collections Books v. Cigarettes (2008), Some Thoughts on the Common Toad (2010), and Decline of the English Murder (2009). The latter does not contain the same texts as Decline of the English Murder and Other Essays, published by Penguin in association with Secker & Warburg in 1965. The complete texts Orwell wrote for the Observer are collected in Orwell: The Observer Years published by Atlantic Books in 2003.

In 1976 Martin Secker & Warburg Ltd in association with Octopus Books published The Complete Novels, this edition was later republished by Penguin Books in 1983, and reprinted in Penguin Classics 2000 and 2009. Since the publication of Davison's corrected critical edition, John Carey's thorough Essays was released on 15 October 2002, as a part of the Everyman's Library and George Packer edited two collections for Houghton Mifflin, released on 13 October 2008—All Art Is Propaganda: Critical Essays and Facing Unpleasant Facts: Narrative Essays.

Sonia Orwell and Ian Angus edited a four volume collection of Orwell's writings, The Collected Essays, Journalism and Letters of George Orwell, divided into four volumes:An Age Like This 1920–1940My Country Right or Left 1940–1943 (first published 1968)As I Please, 1943–1945In Front of Your Nose, 1945–1950The Complete Works of George Orwell is a twenty-volume series, with the first nine being devoted to the non-fiction books and novels and the final eleven volumes entitled:A Kind of Compulsion: 1903–1936Facing Unpleasant Facts: 1937–1939A Patriot After All: 1940–1941All Propaganda Is Lies: 1941–1942Keeping Our Little Corner Clean: 1942–1943Two Wasted Years: 1943I Have Tried to Tell the Truth: 1943–1944I Belong to the Left: 1945Smothered Under Journalism: 1946It Is What I Think: 1947–1948Our Job Is to Make Life Worth Living: 1949–1950In 2001 Penguin published four selections from The Complete Works of George Orwell edited by Peter Davison in their modern classics series titled Orwell and the Dispossessed: Down and Out in Paris and London in the Context of Essays, Reviews and Letters selected from The Complete Works of George Orwell with an introduction by Peter Clarke, Orwell's England: The Road to Wigan Pier in the Context of Essays, Reviews, Letters and Poems selected from The Complete Works of George Orwell with an introduction by Ben Pimlott, Orwell in Spain: The Full Text of Homage to Catalonia with Associated Articles, Reviews and Letters from The Complete Works of George Orwell with an introduction by Christopher Hitchens, and Orwell and Politics: Animal Farm in the Context of Essays, Reviews and Letters selected from The Complete Works of George Orwell with an introduction by Timothy Garton Ash.

Davison later compiled a handful of writings—including letters, an obituary for H. G. Wells, and his reconstruction of Orwell's list—into Lost Orwell: Being a Supplement to The Complete Works of George Orwell, which was published by Timewell Press in 2006, with a paperback published on 25 September 2007. In 2011, Davison's selection of letters and journal entries were published as George Orwell: A Life in Letters and Diaries by Harvill Secker. A selection by Davison from Orwell's journalism and other writings were published by Harvill Secker in 2014 under the title Seeing Things as They Are.

Other works
After his first publication—the poem "Awake! Young Men of England", published in the Henley and South Oxfordshire Standard in 1914—Orwell continued to write for his school publications The Election Times and College Days/The Colleger. He also experimented with writing for several years before he could support himself as an author. These pieces include first-hand journalism (e.g. 1931's "The Spike"), articles (e.g. 1931's "Hop-Picking"), and even a one-act play—Free Will. (He would also adapt four plays as radio dramas.)

His production of fiction was not as prolific—while living in Paris he wrote a few unpublished stories and two novels, but burned the manuscripts. (Orwell routinely destroyed his manuscripts and with the exception of a partial copy of Nineteen Eighty-Four, all are lost. Davison would publish this as Nineteen Eighty-Four: The Facsimile of the Extant Manuscript by Houghton Mifflin Harcourt in May 1984, .) In addition, Orwell produced several pieces while working at the BBC as a correspondent. Some were written by him and others were merely recited for radio broadcast. For years, these went uncollected until the anthologies Orwell: The War Broadcasts (Marboro Books, June 1985 and in the United States, as Orwell: The Lost Writings by Arbor House, September 1985) and Orwell: The War Commentaries (Gerald Duckworth & Company Ltd., London, 1 January 1985) were edited by W. J. West. Orwell was responsible for producing The Indian Section of BBC Eastern Service and his program notes from 1 February and 7 December 1942 have survived (they are reproduced in War Broadcasts). He was also asked to provide an essay about British cooking along with recipes for The British Council. Orwell kept a diary which has been published by his widow—Sonia Brownell—and academic Peter Davison, in addition to his private correspondence.

Full list of publications

Legend for collected editionsAll Art Is Propaganda: Critical Essays (AAIP)Critical Essays (CrE)Collected Essays (ColE)The Collected Essays, Journalism and Letters of George Orwell (CEJL)A Collection of Essays by George Orwell (CoE)Complete Novels (CN)The Complete Works of George Orwell (CW)Decline of the English Murder and Other Essays (DotEM)England Your England and Other Essays (EYE)Essays (Everyman's Library) (EL)Essays (Penguin Classics) (ELp)Facing Unpleasant Facts: Narrative Essays (FUF)Inside the Whale and Other Essays (ItW)Lost Orwell: Being a Supplement to The Complete Works of George Orwell (LO)On Jews and Antisemitism (JaA)Orwell and Politics (OP)Orwell and the Dispossessed (OD) Orwell in Spain (OS) Orwell: The Observer Years (OY) Orwell: The War Broadcasts (WB)Orwell: The War Commentaries (WC)Orwell's England (OE) The Orwell Reader, Fiction, Essays, and Reportage (OR)
Penguin Great IdeasBooks v. Cigarettes (BvC)Decline of the English Murder (DEM)Some Thoughts on the Common Toad (STCM)Why I Write (WIW)Ruins. Orwell’s Reports as War Correspondent in France, Germany and Austria from February until June 1945 (R)Shooting an Elephant and Other Essays (SaE)Selected Essays (SE)Such, Such Were the Joys (SSWtJ)

Notes

References

Bibliography

Further readingGeorge Orwell: Some Materials for a Bibliography by I. R. Wilson. (1953)George Orwell by Laurence Brander. Longmans (1954)George Orwell: A Selected Bibliography by William White and Zoltan G. Zeke. Boston Linotype Print (1962).George Orwell: An Annotated Bibliography of Criticism (Garland Reference Library of the Humanities volume 54) by Jeffrey Meyers and Valerie Meyers. Garland Publishing (1 January 1977) George Orwell, First Edition and Price Guide'' Quill and Brush. (2004)

External links

 
Works by George Orwell at the Internet Archive
Works by Orwell from the Orwell Prize
 
 
 
George Orwell Letters and Documents to Be Found in Libraries and Archives in the United Kingdom by Peter Davison

 
Bibliographies by writer
Bibliographies of English writers
Journalism bibliographies